Lesbian, gay, bisexual, and transgender (LGBT) persons in the  Dominican Republic do not enjoy the same rights as non-LGBT residents, and face legal and social challenges that are not experienced by other people. While the Dominican Criminal Code does not expressly prohibit same-sex sexual relations or cross-dressing, it also does not address discrimination or harassment on the account of sexual orientation or gender identity, nor does it recognize same-sex unions in any form, whether it be marriage or partnerships. Households headed by same-sex couples are also not eligible for any of the same rights given to opposite-sex married couples, as same-sex marriage is constitutionally banned in the country.

A majority of Dominicans affiliate with the Catholic Church. As such, attitudes towards members of the LGBT community tend to reflect prevailing Catholic morals. Support for same-sex marriage was 25% according to a 2013/2014 opinion poll.

Legality of same-sex sexual activity

Consensual same-sex sexual acts between adults in private have been legal in the Dominican Republic since 1822 and the age of consent is set equally at 18 years of age. Previously, the Penal Code criminalised any act that was deemed to be in violation of "decorum and good behaviour" in public, and imposed fines and up to two years imprisonment. This law was sometimes used by police officers to harass, fine or jail same-sex couples who engage in public displays of affection. This was repealed in 1997 through an amendment to the Criminal Code.

Members of the police force are nevertheless subject to different legal standards. Article 210 of the 1966 Police Justice Code still outlaws sodomy (defined as a "sexual act between persons of the same sex") among members of police forces.

Law 285-66 also prohibits LGBT people from serving as members of the police force. Under this law, police officers are also prohibited from engaging in sodomy. In 2014, the law was confirmed that LGBT people were prohibited from joining any police force.

Recognition of same-sex relationships
The family law statutes of the Dominican Republic do not recognize any legal status between persons of the same-sex, neither marriage nor any marriage-like relationship like civil partnerships or domestic partnerships. The Constitution was amended in 2010 to read in Article 55 that: "The State shall promote and protect the family organization based on the institution of marriage between a man and a woman", as part of a series of changes that banned abortion, stripped native-born children of illegal immigrants of their citizenship, and authorized the private ownership of beaches.

However, there are also laws that could be used to justify recognition of such relationships. Article 41, 'Validity of Marriage', of law 544-14, 'Derecho Internacional Privado de La República Dominicana', states that "Marriage is valid ... if it is considered as such by the law of the place of celebration, or by the national law, or of the domicile of at least one of the spouses at the time of the celebration."

2018 Inter-American Court of Human Rights ruling
In January 2018, the Inter-American Court of Human Rights (IACHR) ruled that the American Convention on Human Rights mandates and requires the recognition of same-sex marriage. The ruling was fully binding on Costa Rica and sets a binding precedent for other Latin American and Caribbean countries including the Dominican Republic.

Several Dominican legal experts have since announced that the Dominican Republic must legalise same-sex marriage and implement the IACHR ruling in due course.

Discrimination protections
In the Dominican Republic, few legal instruments in some specific areas protect LGBT people from discrimination. Since 2000, the General Law on Youth (Law 49/2000) has prohibited discrimination on the basis of sexual orientation. Article 11 of the Code of Criminal Procedure, in effect since 2007, establishes that judges and prosecutors must take into account the particular circumstances of each person involved in each case but cannot base their decisions solely based on their sexual orientation. Since 2011, the Law 135/2011 on HIV/AIDS has prohibited discrimination on the basis of sexual orientation and gender identity.

Discrimination on account of sexual orientation or gender identity is not illegal in areas such as employment, education, housing, health care, banking, transportation, government services and public accommodations. As a result, many LGBT people feel the need to remain in the closet and reports of anti-gay discrimination are quite common.

Hate crimes 
LGBT people in the Dominican Republic have sometimes been the targets of violence. From 2006 to 2009, official sources reported the murder of at least 14 transgender sex workers. Bias-motivated crimes have also been reported against LGBT people from the middle and upper classes, including TV producer Micky Breton and Claudio Nasco. Other prominent people who have the targets of such violence include film director Jean Luis Jorge, journalist Víctor Gulías, Dr. Jesús Díaz Almánzar, and William Cordero. In 2014, Van Teasley, a visiting American lawyer and gay activist, was found murdered in his Santo Domingo apartment.

A new Penal Code that included provisions banning hate crimes on the basis of sexual orientation was expected to take effect in December 2015, but it was deemed unconstitutional shortly before taking effect by the Constitutional Court because its sections regarding abortion were "plagued with irregularities and violations". In 2016, the Senate and the Chamber of Deputies approved modifications to the initial version by fully criminalising abortion. Sexual orientation-based hate crimes would have remained banned under this version. However, President Danilo Medina vetoed it in December 2016, asking deputies to legalise abortion in cases of rape, incest and saving the mother's life. A new draft bill was introduced in August 2017 by two deputies, leaving out all parts in regards to abortion. The two deputies stated that abortion should be regulated in a separate law, and complained that this issue had delayed the enactment of other important measures.

If finally approved, the Penal Code would provide penalties of between 30 and 60 years imprisonment for hate crimes. In addition, those who cause torture, cruel, inhuman and degrading treatment to anyone because of their sexual orientation could be sentenced to 30 to 40 years in prison.

Access to health care services
Citizens of the Dominican Republic have a constitutional right to access health care services. Health care programs for the LGBT community in the Dominican Republic have generally focused on HIV/AIDS education, which are often run by non-governmental organizations.

Gender identity and expression
Transgender people in the Dominican Republic are not allowed to change their legal gender and name to reflect their gender identity.

In June 2018, President Danilo Medina issued an executive decree granting 35 transgender Dominicans the possibility to change their legal name so that it matches their gender identity. Television journalist Mía Cepeda was one of the 35 individuals and subsequently managed to change her name to reflect her transgender status.

Living conditions
The socially conservative mores of the Catholic Church and evangelical Protestant denominations hold significant sway in both public policy and prevailing attitudes surrounding LGBT rights. Recent reports suggest that signs of a visible, politically active LGBT community are often targets of a government crackdown, often with the support of religious leaders.

In the summer of 2006, several gay clubs and bars in Santo Domingo were shut down as part of a program of police harassment.

In 2012, members of the police department crashed the LGBT Pride Parade in Santo Domingo and arrested individuals at the parade on the ground that marchers were improperly using the Dominican Republic's flag.

Due to the majority of residents having conservative views, including opposition to homosexuality, the major political parties in the Dominican Republic have not expressed much public support for LGBT rights legislation.

Former U.S. Ambassador Wally Brewster (2013-2017) was openly gay and active in supporting LGBT events in the Dominican Republic, regularly meeting LGBT rights groups and publicly appearing in the Dominican media and schools with his husband. Brewster was often the target of insults from religious leaders and some politicians due to his sexual orientation. Evangelical groups started an unsuccessful petition asking the Government to expel him from the country, and called on Brewster to "go home and cook since he's married to a man."

During an April 2017 LGBT conference held in Santo Domingo, Minister of Women's Affairs Janet Camilo, speaking on behalf of the Dominican Government, said that "everyone should be equal under the law and in society" and that the Government was "doing everything possible to build and fight for equality, for an inclusive society for everyone." The conference was attended by LGBT activists from across Latin America, including Rosmit Mantilla, member of the Venezuelan opposition Popular Will party.

Prostitution
Prostitution has become a harsh necessity for some members of the LGBT community, who find it difficult to earn their living in the formal economic sector because of high levels of discrimination and harassment that LGBT people often face. Poverty, drug addiction and violence often surround the men and transgender people who become prostitutes.

Non-governmental organizations
Amigos Siempre Amigos (ASA; "Friends Always Friends") is a non-governmental organization (NGO) in the Dominican Republic that addresses health concerns among the LGBT community.

Trans Siempre Amigas (TRANSSA, "Trans Always Friends") is another Dominican Republic-based organization that promotes respect, fairness, and tolerance of the transgender community.

Diversidad Dominicana is an activist organization that supports LGBT rights.

Public opinion
According to a Pew Research Center survey conducted between 2 November 2013 and 2 February 2014, 25% of respondents supported same-sex marriage and 72% opposed it.

According to a 2017 poll carried out by ILGA, 22% of Dominicans agreed that gay, lesbian and bisexual people should enjoy the same rights as straight people, while 68% disagreed. Additionally, 21% agreed that they should be protected from workplace discrimination. 52% of Dominicans, however, said that people who are in same-sex relationships should be charged as criminals, while 48% disagreed. As for transgender people, 14% agreed that they should have the same rights, 10% believed they should be protected from employment discrimination and a plurality of 5% believed they should be allowed to change their legal gender.

The 2017 AmericasBarometer showed that 7% of Dominicans supported same-sex marriage.

Summary table

See also

LGBT rights in the Americas
Wally Brewster, former US ambassador
Güevedoce

Notes

External links
Constitutions of the Dominican Republic (1994, 2002, 2010), Georgetown University, Political Database of the Americas 
ILGA: Dominican Republic
Suprema Corte de Justicia Constitution of D. R. 

Dominican Republic
Politics of the Dominican Republic
Law of the Dominican Republic
Dominican Republic
Dominican Republic
Human rights in the Dominican Republic
LGBT in the Dominican Republic